TOX high mobility group box family member 3, also known as TOX3, is a human gene.

The protein encoded by this gene is a member of a subfamily of transcription factors that also includes TOX, TOX2, and TOX4 that share almost identical HMG-box DNA-binding domains which function to modify chromatin structure by unwinding and bending DNA. The protein TOX3 has a glutamine-rich C-terminus due to CAG repeats. TOX3 is located on human chromosome band 16q12.1. The gene consists of seven exons and is highly expressed in both the brain and luminal epithelial breast tissue. Mutations in the gene are associated with increased susceptibility to breast cancer. TOX3 plays a role in regulating calcium-dependent transcription and interacts with cAMP-response-element-binding protein (CREB) and CREB-binding protein (CBP). It also increases transcription via interaction with CITED1, a transcription co-regulator that increases transcription factor activity.

Disease linkage
Mutations in the TOX3 gene are associated with an increased risk of breast cancer.

The risk allele rs3803662 is a low-penetrance SNP (single nucleotide polymorphism) associated with decreased expression of TOX3 and an increase in breast cancer risk. The risk locus was reported to regulate affinity of FOXA1 binding to chromatin, potentially affecting TOX3 expression. This locus also interacts with high-penetrance mutations BRCA1 and BRCA2 to increase risk. The rs3803662 variant has a high frequency in the population, with a minor allele frequency of 0.25.

Little is known of the transcriptional mechanisms and protein interactions of TOX3. However, a 2019 publication identified TOX3 as a cancer suppressor gene in clear cell renal cell carcinoma (ccRCC) and reported that downregulation of TOX3 facilitates the epithelial mesenchymal transition by decreasing repression of SNAI1 and SNAI2, resulting in tumor growth and metastasis. Like breast cancer, downregulation of TOX3 is associated with worse prognosis in ccRCC patients.

References 

Transcription factors